The Blekinge Fotbollförbund (Blekinge Football Association) is one of the 24 district organisations of the Swedish Football Association. It administers lower tier football in Blekinge County.

Background 

Blekinge Fotbollförbund, commonly referred to as Blekinge FF, is the governing body for football in the County of Blekinge. The Association was founded on 25 March 1917 and currently has 63 member clubs.  Based in Karlshamn, the Association's Chairman is Per-Ola Johansson.

Affiliated Members 

The following clubs are affiliated to the Blekinge FF:

 AIK Atlas
 Ankaret FK
 Asarums FF
 Asarums IF FK
 Backaryd SK
 Belganet-Hallabro IF
 Björkenäs-Pukaviks IF
 BK Eken
 BK Glasbacken
 BK Union
 Blåningsmåla IF
 Drottningskärs IF
 Eringsboda SK
 FC Fridhem
 FC Giffarna
 Fjärdsjömåla AIF
 FK Sölvesborg United
 Fridlevstad GoIF
 Gammalstorps GoIF
 Gränums IF
 Halasjö AIF
 Hällaryds IF
 Hanö IF
 Hasselstad BK
 Hasslö GoIF
 Hemsjö AIK
 Hoby GIF
 Högadals IS
 Hörvikens IF
 IF Lörbytjejerna
 IF Trion
 IFK Karlshamn
 Jämjö GoIF
 Jämshögs IF
 Johannishus SK
 Kallinge SK
 Karlskrona AIF
 Karlskrona FC
 Karlskrona FF
 Karlskrona FK
 Kristianopels GoIF
 Listerby IK
 Lörby IF
 Lyckeby GoIF
 Märserums IF
 Mjällby AIF
 Mörrums GoIS FK
 Nättraby GoIF
 Olofströms IF
 Ramdala IF
 Ringamåla IK
 Rödeby AIF
 Rödeby FC
 Ronneby BK
 Saxemara IF
 Sifarna FF
 Sillhövda AIK
 Sölve BK
 Sölvesborgs GoIF
 Svängsta IF
 Torhamns GoIF
 Tvings GoIF
 Vilshults IF

League Competitions 
Blekinge FF run the following League Competitions:

Men's Football
Division 4  -  one section 
Division 5  -  one section 
Division 6  -  two sections

Women's Football
Division 4  -  one section 
Division 5  -  one section

Footnotes

External links 
Blekinge FF Official Website 

Blekinge
Football in Blekinge County
Sports organizations established in 1917
1917 establishments in Sweden